The Lost Domain may refer to:
 Le Grand Meaulnes, a novel by Alain-Fournier  (one of several English translations of the title)
 The Lost Domain (film) (Le domaine perdu), a 2005 movie directed by Raoul Ruiz loosely based on the above novel
 Lost Domain, a 2014 album by Tim Wheeler